The Nissan Qashqai is a compact crossover SUV (C-segment) developed and produced by the Japanese car manufacturer Nissan since 2006. The first generation of the vehicle was sold under the name  in Japan and Australia, and Qashqai in other markets. The second generation, which was released in 2014, was not sold in Japan and is badged as the Qashqai in all countries it is sold, except in the United States, where it is rebadged as the Nissan Rogue Sport. The third and current generation was released in 2021.

Nissan named the vehicle after the Qashqai people, who live in mountainous Central and Southwestern Iran.



Development
When the Renault–Nissan Alliance was formed in 1999, Nissan new COO Carlos Ghosn instructed the company to transform its product portfolio in Europe. The C-segment Almera, a slow-seller in Europe became a primary focus. In early 2002, 25 European Nissan engineers travelled to the brand’s technical centre in Japan to start of a 12-month project to develop the successor of the Almera. It was projected to be larger, to compete with the SEAT Altea and Volkswagen Golf Plus.

In December 2002, the company concluded the planned model would not be as profitable and competitive as was required. The development team eventually came up with the idea of a "mini-Murano" type of vehicle smaller than the X-Trail that would be positioned to compete with hatchback and saloons. The development was focused on creating a European-oriented vehicle with the desirability, practicality and versatility of an SUV but with the size, driving dynamics and running costs of a family hatchback. While engineering work was done by Nissan's European Technical Centre (NTCE), a design proposal was put forward by Nissan Design Europe (NDE), which created the 2004 Qashqai concept.

During final development, Nissan decided the Qashqai would serve as a replacement for both the Almera in the C-segment and Primera in the D-segment. Nissan selected Nissan Motor Manufacturing UK as its manufacturing plant for the European market.

First generation (J10; 2006)

First unveiled as a concept vehicle at the 2004 Geneva Motor Show, the first-generation Qashqai was globally presented at the 2006 Paris Motor Show. It went on sale in February 2007, and Nissan aimed for more than 100,000 sales a year. Codenamed P32L, Nissan said the car would cater to buyers who want a more dynamic design, but are not attracted to the large, aggressive nature of an SUV. The car slots below the X-Trail in the Nissan range and partially replaces the conventional Primera and the smaller Almera. It is the first model to be styled by Nissan Design Europe in London, with engineering development led by Nissan Technical Centre Europe (NTCE) in Cranfield, Bedfordshire.

The Qashqai uses the same platform as the X-Trail. It received a five star Euro NCAP safety rating – the best ever adult occupant score.

Five engine choices were available: a  1.6 L or a  2.0 L petrol, while the  1.5 L,  1.6 L and  2.0 L provide the diesel offerings.

The first-generation Qashqai sold more than 1.24 million units in Europe during its seven year production run. From the UK, the first-generation Qashqai was also exported to the Middle East and other overseas markets.

Name
Nissan considered releasing the Chinese version as the CCUV (Compact Crossover Utility Vehicle). In Australia, the first-generation Qashqai carries the name Dualis from the Japanese market because Nissan worried Qashqai could be pronounced "cash cow". The press has often used that pun to describe the sales success of the model.

Production
The Qashqai has been built at the Nissan Motor Manufacturing UK (NMUK) plant in Sunderland, Tyne and Wear, United Kingdom, since December 2006. It occupied the production line previously used to assemble the Primera on Line 1 and a percentage of Almera from line 2.

Qashqai+2 (NJ10)
Production of the Qashqai+2, a seven-seat model, began at the UK plant in July 2008. The chassis is unique from the A-pillar back, while trim and engine models remain identical to the standard Qashqai.

The Qashqai+2 was discontinued in 2013, and replaced by the T32 X-Trail with a seven-seat configuration.

2010 facelift
In December 2009, Nissan announced a refreshed version of the first-generation Qashqai, which went on sale in March 2010. The model's front end has been completely restyled, while the rear now includes LED tail lights. Modifications to the interior include a new instrument panel layout for the vehicle's drive computer, better soundproofing and minor storage additions.

In the European market, electronic stability control became standard across the range and two new exterior colours have been added. An "eco-friendly" Pure Drive variant was also introduced.

2011 engine update

A new 1.6 dCi engine replaces the previous 2.0 dCi. Nissan has not released full performance figures, but says the 1.6 dCi has a quicker  acceleration figure than the 2.0 dCi.

Nissan has also added its Around View Monitor as standard equipment for 360 (replaces N-tec) versions of the Qashqai and Qashqai+2. The system uses a set of external cameras to create a 360 degree "bird's eye" view of the car to help with parking manoeuvres. The driver can also focus individually on front, rear or passenger cameras to look out for a particular obstacle.

Markets

Japan

The Japanese domestic market Dualis was offered in 2.0 G, 2.0 S, 2.0 G Four, and 2.0 S Four trim levels. All models are powered by 2.0-litre MR20DE engine matched to six-speed Xtronic CVT. The Dualis was discontinued in Japan on 31 March 2014, after which the Juke was the only Nissan's mini SUV still produced and sold in Japan.

Middle East
In some Middle Eastern markets, the first-generation Qashqai was offered in S, SE and LE, Standard on all trims is the 2.0-litre  MR20DE engine with CVT.

New Zealand
The Qashqai was introduced to New Zealand in May 2009, initially sourced from Japan. Nissan New Zealand used the Qashqai name to distinguish the model from Dualis grey imports, which were shipped from Japan before the official release. The New Zealand spec Qashqai was then sourced from the UK plant from August 2009. As of 2016 the range consisted of three specification levels: ST, ST-L and Ti, all with 2WD 2.0L MR20DE CVT. A TS model (1.6 diesel) was also available. The Qashqai+2 was added to the range in July 2010 but discontinued with the new model launch in 2014. The updated X-Trail (Rogue in United States), released at about the same time, became the only seven-seater option.

United Kingdom
The Qashqai has been made at the plant in Sunderland, England, since December 2006, occupying the production line previously occupied by the Nissan Primera on Line 1 and a percentage of Almera from line 2. Its launch coincided with the withdrawal of the Primera from the UK market due to low sales. This left Nissan with no direct successor to the Almera or Primera on the UK market, with the "supermini MPV" Note being sold as an indirect successor to the Almera, and the Qashqai as a successor to the Primera. This move was seen as controversial, but in time appears to have paid off as the Qashqai has proved a major sales success in the UK, with more than 39,000 sales in 2010 making it the tenth best selling new car in Britain – the first Nissan to make the top ten in Britain since the Sunny in 1983. In 2010, Nissan was considering whether to introduce the Nissan Tiida to Europe, it having already directly replaced the Almera in other markets. In 2012, the Qashqai's sixth year on sale in the UK, sales exceeded 45,000 to make it the sixth best selling car there that year.

Russia
The Qashqai and Qashqai+2 (seven seat version) were available in Russia with the following gasoline powered four-cylinder engines:

For Qashqai
 1.6 L —  2WD; 5MT and CVT
 2.0 L —  2WD and 4WD; 6MT and CVT
For Qashqai+2
 1.6 L —  2WD; 5MT
 2.0 L —  2WD with 6MT only; 4WD with 6MT or CVT

Recall
On 13 September 2012, Nissan recalled 51,000 cars worldwide to investigate a reported steering wheel problem. It affected the Qashqai, Qashqai+2 and NV200 models.

Second generation (J11; 2013)

The Qashqai J11 was introduced in London on 7 November 2013 at a worldwide streamed launch. The vehicle is larger and based on an all-new CMF-CD platform shared with the Nissan X-Trail/Rogue and Renault Kadjar. It went on sale in the UK in February 2014. The Qashqai J11 was awarded What Car? "Car of the Year" 2014.

The Dualis nameplate has been discontinued in Japan, as the second generation Qashqai is not sold there. At the time, Nissan Japan instead offers the smaller Juke, and the third-generation X-Trail.

The first generation model with the Dualis nameplate was sold alongside the newer model, which has borne the Qashqai name in Australia since July 2014.

Globally, it was available in 1.6-litre petrol and turbo-diesel engines, 1.5-litre turbo-diesel, 1.2-litre petrol turbocharged engine and 2.0-litre petrol engine.

In September 2015, Nissan rolled a record-breaking 500,000th Qashqai off the production line at the UK plant, the fastest time for a vehicle built in the UK to reach a half million units.

Facelift
On 27 October 2016, Nissan announced that the facelifted Qashqai J11b would be produced at the UK plant. The facelifted Qashqai was unveiled at the 2017 Geneva Motor Show and has been sold for the North American market as the Nissan Rogue Sport from 2020.

Markets

North America
In July 2015, Nissan announced a smaller counterpart of the Rogue to be marketed in North America. At the 2017 North American International Auto Show in Detroit, Michigan, Nissan revealed the North American version of the Qashqai to slot between the Juke and the Rogue. For the U.S, it was known as the Rogue Sport to tie it in with the popular Rogue nameplate. In Canada, the Qashqai kept its original name.

Priced below the Rogue, the Rogue Sport replaces the Rogue Select, a version of the first-generation Nissan Rogue which has been discontinued from Nissan's lineup in the United States since 2015. The Rogue Sport went on sale in the United States in the spring of 2017 for the 2017 model year.

Due to the significant differences in regulation between the U.S. and Europe, Nissan's UK plant did not produce the Rogue Sport. Instead, the North American market Rogue Sport/Qashqai were sourced from Japan.

The US-market Rogue Sport and Canadian Qashqai is powered by a 2.0-litre,  inline-four petrol engine paired with CVT. It was offered in three trim levels, which consists of S, SV, and SL. Both front-wheel-drive and all-wheel-drive was offered.

For the 2020 model year, the Rogue Sport got a refresh with a new front bumper cover and hood, new headlights and tail lights along with new alloy wheels. It went on sale in the fall of 2019.

Production of the Rogue Sport ended in December 2022, making 2022 the final model year for the US.

China
Dongfeng Nissan started marketing locally produced Qashqai in the Chinese market since 2015. Engine options available were 1.2-litre turbocharged petrol and 2.0-litre naturally aspirated petrol. All models are mated with Nissan's Xtronic CVT, except for the base 1.2-litre turbo variant which is mated with a six-speed manual gearbox.

Russia 
Since 2014, the second-generation Qashqai was assembled in Nissan's Russian plant in Saint Petersburg in order to free up some production capacity in the UK plant and avoid import tariffs. Nissan stopped assembling Qashqai at St. Petersburg plant from March 2022 and to exit Russian market by selling its factory for 1 euro.

Powertrain

Diesel emission problem
In May 2016, South Korea's environment ministry alleged Nissan used a so-called defeat device in Qashqai with diesel engines to turn off its exhaust reduction system under regular driving temperatures. It fined Nissan and ordered a recall of models with Euro 6 engines. Nissan tried to sue the South Korean government but lost the court case. The South Korean regulator tested the emissions of 20 diesel vehicles after the VW diesel scandal and found the Qashqai to be the only one that failed the tests.

In the UK, the Qashqai diesel model was found to emit up to 18 times more nitrogen oxides than the official EU lab-based test allowed.

Third generation (J12; 2021)

The third-generation Qashqai was revealed on 18 February 2021. The vehicle is slightly larger than before, being  longer,  wider and  taller, while its wheelbase is  longer, and based on the CMF-CD platform shared with the Nissan Rogue/X-Trail (T33) and Renault Austral.

It is claimed to use more lightweight materials and advanced stamping and welding techniques in its construction to increase strength and reduce weight. The bonnet, front fenders and doors are made of aluminium and are  lighter, while the tailgate is made from composites and saves .

For better visibility, Nissan engineered a thinner A-pillar design and the mounting of the wing mirrors on the doors instead of the A-pillar. The boot is also 50 litres larger due to the lower cargo floor and redesigned suspension.

It is paired to either a 6-speed manual or an Xtronic CVT transmission. All-wheel-drive is available for the 156 hp option with CVT.

For the first time, the Qashqai range also includes the e-Power hybrid powertrain. The system uses the ICE engine as a generator of electricity and disconnected to the driven wheels. The system combines a  1.5-liter variable-compression petrol engine with a  electric motor, a power generator, and an inverter, making it a series hybrid with no plug-in capability.

Safety

Latin NCAP
The UK-made Qashqai in its most basic Latin American configuration with 6 airbags, airbag switch, load limiters, UN127, ESC, ISA, and full SBR received 5 stars from Latin NCAP in 2022 under its new protocol (similar to Euro NCAP 2014).

Sales

Nissan does not provide exact sales figures for the Rogue Sport in the US, instead grouping them together with the Rogue.

References

External links

 

Qashqai
Cars introduced in 2007
2010s cars
2020s cars
Compact sport utility vehicles
Crossover sport utility vehicles
Front-wheel-drive vehicles
All-wheel-drive vehicles
Vehicles with CVT transmission
Euro NCAP small family cars
Euro NCAP small off-road

Latin NCAP small off-road